In linguistics, a surface filter is a type of sound change that operates not at a particular point in time but over a longer period. Surface filters normally affect any phonetic combination that is not permitted according to the language's phonetic rules and so preserve the phonotactics of that language. They are also often a source of complementary distribution between certain sets of sounds.

A trivial example of a surface filter is the replacement of sounds foreign to a language with sounds native to the language. For example, a language that has no front rounded vowels may replace such vowels with either front unrounded or back rounded vowels, whenever it borrows a word containing such a vowel. Strictly speaking, that is not a surface filter, as it is merely the way in which the phonetics of one language are matched to that of another. That example, however, still illustrates the importance of surface filters in preserving the phonological structure of words within the language. Usually, the term applies only to rules that affect both native and borrowed words.

Examples
One very common example of a surface filter is final-obstruent devoicing in which a voiced obstruent at the end of a word is automatically converted to their unvoiced counterpart. If that were a regular sound change, the devoicing would occur only at a particular point in time, and any new words that entered the language later might end in voiced obstruents. However, new words are automatically "passed through the filter" like earlier words, and their final obstruents are devoiced automatically.

That happens even if there is apocope of final vowels, with non-final obstruents becoming final. A historical example in Dutch occurs in many verbs, such as blazen ("to blow"). The original Middle Dutch first-person singular present form was blaze, but when the final -e was lost, the form did not become *blaaz (the doubled vowel is only a spelling convention), but the -z was automatically devoiced to create the modern form, blaas.

Two other examples of surface filters in the history of the Germanic languages were Sievers' law and the Germanic spirant law.

Sievers' law caused a restriction on the distribution between -j- and -ij-. The former appeared after a consonant following a short vowel, and the latter otherwise occurred. The process was automatic and affected even new words and loanwords: the Latin word puteus ("pit, well"), for example, was borrowed into Germanic as the two-syllable *putjaz. The more-faithful rendering *putijaz was not permitted since the short vowel u was followed by a single consonant t.

The Germanic spirant law affected combinations of an obstruent that was followed by -t-. Such obstruents were automatically converted into fricatives, with dentals becoming -s-, and devoiced. For example, the Latin word scriptum ("writing") was borrowed into Germanic as *skriftiz. The forbidden combination -pt- was replaced by -ft-.

Application
Surface filters are often formed as a result of sound changes that change the phonetic makeup, and certain sounds or combinations no longer occur in the language. As a consequence, speakers no longer learn to pronounce such combinations and so have difficulty with new words that violate the principles. Then, either the phonology of the language is extended to incorporate such new combinations, or the "inconvenient" combinations are automatically reconstructed into a form that conforms to the phonotactics of the language. If the reconstruction occurs systematically and becomes part of the phonology of the language, the result is a surface filter.

Such phonological rules may continue to apply for an indefinite amount of time. Final-obstruent devoicing in Dutch, for example, has been a phonological rule since Old Dutch, over 1000 years ago. The Germanic spirant law may have been formed as part of Grimm's law long before written records began, but it ceased to operate shortly after the Germanic languages began to separate, around the middle of the 1st millennium AD.

Sometimes, sound changes occur that directly violate a surface filter, which may cause it to cease operating. Sievers' law presumably lost relevance in the West Germanic languages after the operation of the West Germanic gemination since it eliminated the contrast between light and heavy syllables, at the core of the law's operation.

Phonology
Phonotactics
Sound changes